The Corsican brook salamander or Corsican mountain newt (Euproctus montanus) is a species of salamander in the family Salamandridae. It is endemic to Corsica, an island in the Mediterranean Sea.

The Corsican brook salamander is found primarily in rocky streams, springs, and rivers in forest and maquis at altitudes of over 600 m.

Description
The head is long with a rounded snout, and the tail is oval in cross section and as long as the rest of the animal. The parotoid glands on the side of the neck are distinct. The males have spurs on the hind legs and a backwards-pointing conical cloaca, whereas the females have a cloaca with a ventral opening. The skin is smooth when it is living in the water, but becomes more granular when living on land. The colour is brown or olive, sometimes with mottling of orange, red, or brown, particularly near the spine. It has a paler, fairly uniformly coloured underside, sometimes with white flecks, but is not spotted on the throat. The only other salamander on the island is the Corsican fire salamander (Salamandra corsica) which has distinctive black and yellow colouring.

Distribution and habitat
The Corsican brook salamander is endemic to the island of Corsica. It is mainly aquatic, living in lakes, ponds, and the slower-moving parts of streams, often hiding under stones. When on land, it does not stray far from water and inhabits maquis and woods, where it can be found in the undergrowth or under fallen logs and rocks.

Biology
The Corsican brook salamander lives in well-oxygenated waters where it breathes through its skin. Its lungs are either not present or reduced to vestigial organs. Nevertheless, it can move about on land and hibernates underground during the winter. It enters a terrestrial phase after breeding and is mainly nocturnal, feeding on insects and small invertebrates.

Near the coast, breeding may take place twice a year in spring and early autumn, but at greater altitudes, mating takes place in midsummer. The male grasps the female with his jaws and wraps his tail round her while using his cloaca to deposit one or two spermatophores in her cloaca. She then lays about 30 large, yolky eggs, which are deposited in crevices and under stones, and she guards them until they hatch about 50 days later. The larvae (tadpoles) take about 9 months before they undergo metamorphosis and develop into juveniles.

Status
The Corsican brook salamander is listed as being of "least concern" in the IUCN Red List of Threatened Species, because, although it has a very limited range, it is common in suitable habitats within that range and the population is not believed to be dwindling. Threats that might occur include pollution of the streams and lakes in which it lives, the introduction of trout which compete for food and may also prey on it, and the destruction of its habitat and consequent fragmentation of populations.

References

Newts
Amphibians described in 1838
Endemic fauna of Corsica
Amphibians of Europe
Taxa named by Paolo Savi
Taxonomy articles created by Polbot